Three-Chord Monte is an EP by Pegboy, released in 1990 through Quarterstick Records.

Track listing

Personnel
Pegboy
Larry Damore – drums
Joe Haggerty – vocals
John Haggerty – guitar
Steve Saylors – bass guitar, backing vocals
Production and additional personnel
Iain Burgess – production, engineering

References

External links 
 

1990 EPs
Albums produced by Iain Burgess
Pegboy albums
Quarterstick Records EPs